Joshua Webb (born 10 August 1995) is an English footballer who plays for Hednesford Town, as a defender. He started his career with Aston Villa's youth sides, before moving to Scottish Premiership club Kilmarnock in 2016.

Career

Domestic
Webb, began his career in 2005 with Aston Villa, playing with the club's youth squads up until U23s.

In July 2016, Webb was one of 11 players to be signed by Kilmarnock manager Lee Clark. His first appearances came for the club in July 2016, in the Scottish League Cup against Greenock Morton and Albion Rovers. Webb's next appearance for the side wasn't until December 2016, where he was a second-half substitute in the 4–0 loss to Heart of Midlothian.

Webb was released by Kilmarnock and signed for Kidderminster Harriers in March 2017. In 2021 he signed for Hednesford Town.

International
Webb began his international career in 2001 playing for England U17s in a number of UEFA U17 Championship matches, including against Ukraine U17s and the Netherlands U17s. He subsequently went on to make one appearance for England U18s, against Belgium U18 in 2013.

Career statistics

References

External links
 
 

Living people
1995 births
English footballers
Association football defenders
Aston Villa F.C. players
Kilmarnock F.C. players
Scottish Professional Football League players
Kidderminster Harriers F.C. players
Coleshill Town F.C. players
Hednesford Town F.C. players